Koblenz railway station may refer to one of several railway stations:

 In the German city of Koblenz
 Koblenz Hauptbahnhof
 Koblenz Stadtmitte station
 Koblenz-Lützel station
 Koblenz-Ehrenbreitstein station
 In the Swiss town of Koblenz
 Koblenz railway station (Switzerland)
 Koblenz Dorf railway station